LIM kinase-1 (LIMK1) and LIM kinase-2 (LIMK2) are actin-binding kinases that phosphorylate members of the ADF/cofilin family of actin binding and filament severing proteins.  ADF/cofilin are the only substrates yet identified for the LIM kinases. LIM kinases directly phosphorylate and inactivate members of the cofilin family, resulting in stabilization of filamentous (F)-actin. Lim kinases are activated by signaling through small GTPases of the Rho family. Upstream, LIMK1 is regulated by Pak1, and LIMK2 by the Rho-dependent kinase ROCK. Lim Kinases are activated by PAK (p21-activated kinase).  Recent work indicates that LIMK activity is also modulated by HIV-1 viral proteins.

There are approximately 40 known eukaryotic LIM proteins, so named for the LIM domains they contain. LIM domains are highly conserved cysteine-rich structures containing 2 zinc fingers. Although zinc fingers usually function by binding to DNA or RNA, the LIM motif probably mediates protein–protein interactions. LIM kinase-1 and LIM kinase-2 belong to a small subfamily with a unique combination of 2 N-terminal LIM motifs and a C-terminal protein kinase domain. LIMK1 is likely to be a component of an intracellular signaling pathway and may be involved in brain development. LIMK1 hemizygosity is implicated in the impaired visuospatial constructive cognition of Williams syndrome.

References

External links
 

EC 2.7.1